Buddhism is the third-largest religious affiliation and formed about 0.63% of the population of Bangladesh. It is said that Buddha once in his life came to this region of East Bengal to spread his teachings and he was successful in converting the local people to Buddhism, specially in the Chittagong division and later on Pala empire propagate and patronized Buddhist religion throughout the Bengal territory. About 1 million people in Bangladesh adhere to the Theravada school of Buddhism. Over 65% of the Buddhist population is concentrated in the Chittagong Hill Tracts region, where it is the predominant faith of the Rakhine, Chakma, Marma, Tanchangya, other Jumma people and the Barua. The remaining 35% are Bengali Buddhists. Buddhist communities are present in the urban centers of Bangladesh, particularly Chittagong and Dhaka.

History

Legend said that Gautama Buddha came to the region to spread Buddhism, and it was speculated that one or two individuals became monks to follow in his footsteps. However, Buddhism did not gain much support until the reign of Asoka when Buddhism gained a toehold. The Pala Empire that controlled the Indian subcontinent spread many Buddhist ideologies in modern Bangladesh and built many monasteries such as the Mahasthangarh and the Somapura Mahavihara. During the Pala Dynasty, a famous teacher named Atisha was born in the city of Bikrampur and spread Mahayana Buddhism.

Chandra Dynasty's Puranchandra and Subarnachandra adopted Buddhism, as did their successors Trailokyachandra and Srichandra who ruled Harikel and Chandradwip (Barisal). The Khadga Dynasty was a Buddhist dynasty of kings that carried the surname Bhatt. They made several temples and monasteries. King Rajabhata was for example a very committed Mahayanist Buddhist.

Buddhism in various forms appears to have been prevalent at the time of the Turkic conquest in 1202. The invading armies found numerous monasteries, which they destroyed. With the destruction of centres of Buddhist learning, such as Nalanda University, Buddhism rapidly disintegrated. In subsequent centuries and up through the 1980s nearly all the remaining Buddhists lived in the region around Chittagong, which had not been entirely conquered until the time of the British Raj (1858–1947). During the 19th century, a revival movement developed that led to the development of two orders of Theravada monks, the Sangharaj Nikaya and the Mahasthabir Nikaya.

In the Chittagong Hills, Buddhist tribes formed the majority of the population, and their religion appeared to be a mixture of tribal beliefs and Buddhist doctrines. According to the 1981 census, there were approximately 538,000 Buddhists in Bangladesh, representing less than 1 percent of the population.

Demographic overview 

Buddhism in Bangladesh by decades

As of 2014, followers of Buddhism are mainly people of Baruas living in Chittagong city, the business city of Bangladesh and indigenous Arakanese descent living in the sub-tropical Chittagong Hill Tracts. People who follow Buddhism in Bangladesh belong to the Barua people in majority with the percentage of 65% among the 0.07% population of Bangladesh, Chakma, Chak, Marma, Tanchangya and the Khyang, who had been since time immemorial have practiced Buddhism. Other tribes, notably those who practice Animism, have come under some Buddhist influence, and this is true in the case of the Khumi and the Mru, and to a lesser extent on the other tribes.

Buddhist sites

 Somapura Mahavihara in Naogaon, Rajshahi Division was built during the Pala-era and was part of a network of monasteries including Nalanda, Vikramashila and Jaggadala. It is a UNESCO World Heritage Site.
 Jagaddala Mahavihara in Naogaon, Rajshahi was an 11th century Buddhist monastic establishment located in the historical Varendra region. Was probably active till at least the 12th century.
 Halud Vihara in Naogaon, Rajshahi
 Agrapuri Vihara in Naogaon, Rajshahi
 Vasu Vihara in Bogra, Rajshahi 
 Sitakot Vihara in Nawabganj, Rangpur Division.
 Bhitagarh in Panchagarh District, Rangpur Division.
 Pandit Vihara in Chittagong
 Bikrampur Vihara in Bikrampur,  Dhaka Division.
 Shalban Vihara in Comilla
 Wari-Bateshwar ruins in Narsingdi,  Dhaka Division.
 Nateshwar Deul, in Munshiganj, Dhaka Division

Culture

There are several active monasteries in the Chittagong, and in most Buddhist villages there is a school (kyong) where boys live and learn to read Bengali (national language) and some Pali (an ancient Buddhist scriptural language). It is common for men who have finished their schooling to return at regular intervals for periods of residence in the school. The local Buddhist shrine is often an important center of village life.

Buddhism outside the monastic retreats has absorbed and adapted indigenous popular creeds and beliefs of the regions to which it has spread. In most areas religious ritual focuses on the image of the Buddha, and the major festivals observed by Buddhists in Bangladesh commemorate the important events of his life. Although doctrinal Buddhism rejects the worship of gods and preserves the memory of the Buddha as an enlightened man, popular Buddhism contains a pantheon of gods and lesser deities headed by the Buddha.

The Ministry of Religious Affairs provides assistance for the maintenance of Buddhist places of worship and relics. The ancient monasteries at Paharpur (in Rajshahi Region) and Mainamati (in Comilla Region), dating from the seventh to ninth century A.D., are considered unique for their size and setting and are maintained as state-protected monuments.

Persecution of Buddhists

List of massacres targeted at Hindus and Buddhists minorities by radical Islamists and Razakar:
 1962 Rajshahi massacres
 1964 East-Pakistan riots
 1971 Bangladesh genocide
 2012 Ramu violence
 Riots against indigenous Buddhist minorities
 Persecution of Buddhists in Bangladesh

Prominent Bangladeshi Buddhists

Historical figures
 Atisa - 10th century Buddhist monk who played a prominent role in the spread of Buddhism to Tibet. Also an abbot at Vikramashila monastery.
 Chandragomin - 7th century Buddhist lay practitioner and poet from the Varendra region
 Traillokyachandra - 10th century King of the Chandra dynasty who converted to Vajrayana Buddhism
 Vanaratna (1384–1468 CE) who is considered the last Indian Buddhist Pandit in Tibet.
Bhikkhus (monks) 

 Karmayogi Kripasaran Mahathero
 Ven. Jyotipal Mahathero
 Rajguru Aggavamsa Mahathera
 Rajguru Priyo Ratana Mahathera
 U Pannya Jota Mahathera|Ven. U Pannya Jota Mahathera
 Ven. Prajnananda Mahathera
 Suddhananda Mahathero
 Bishuddhananda Mahathera

Administration

Barrister Devasish Roy, Chakma Raja (Chakma Circle Chief)
Bijoy Giri (15th Chakma Raja of Chakma Circle)
Benita Roy (aristocrat, litterateur, diplomat, minister and Rani of Chakma Circle)
Raja Nalinaksha Roy (49th Raja Of Chakma Circle)
Mong Prue Sain (King of Mong Circle)

Freedom fighters
UK Ching, Bir Bikram

Politics

Dilip Barua (Communist Party of Bangladesh (Marxist–Leninist) (Barua)). Former Minister of Industries.
Jyotirindra Bodhipriya Larma
Manabendra Narayan Larma
Charu Bikash Chakma
Kalparanjan Chakma
Ma Mya Ching
Aung Shwe Prue Chowdhury
Sacing Prue Jerry
Maa Ma Ching Marma

Arts and literature

 Benimadhab Barua
 Kanak Chanpa Chakma, artist
Bipradash Barua, author
Partha Barua, singer, lead vocal and guitarist of Souls Band
setu Barua
Subrata Barua
Ratan Talukder, Actor and martial artist

Education
Bikiran Prasad Barua
Sukomal Barua
Amit Chakma
Aye Thein Rakhaine, Academic and Politician

Sports
Debabrata Barua, cricket
Debashish Barua, cricket
Sumon Barua, cricket
Monika Chakma, football
Rupna Chakma, football
Anai Mogini, football
Anuching Mogini, football
Maria Manda, football
Ritu Porna Chakma, football
Sura Krishna Chakma, professional boxer
Aungmraching Marma, football
Champa Chakma, cricket

See also
 Early Buddhist Texts
 Early Buddhist schools
 Pāli Canon
 Mangala Sutta
 Metta Sutta
 Ratana Sutta
 Madhu Purnima
 Bengali Buddhists
 Barua (Bangladesh)
 Chakma people
 Marma people
 Rakhine people
 Jumma people
 Buddha Dhatu Jadi
 Kamalapur Dharmarajika Bauddha Vihara
 Barua Buddhist Institutes in India and Bangladesh
 Bangladesh Bauddha Kristi Prachar Sangha
 Chittagong Pali College
 Bangladesh Sanskrit and Pali Education Board

References

 
Bangladesh